Vittorio Capparelli is a politician in Montreal, Quebec, Canada. He served on the Montreal city council from 1986 to 1998 and was a member of the Montreal executive committee (i.e., the municipal cabinet) from 1994 to 1996.

Early life and career
Capparelli was born in Italy and moved to Canada in 1967. He was initially a lathe operator and later became the administrator of Patronat INCA, a group providing services for Quebec workers of Italian origin.

City councillor
Montreal Citizens' Movement
Capparelli first ran for city council in 1982 municipal election as a candidate of the progressive Montreal Citizens' Movement (MCM) and finished second to Civic Party incumbent George Savoidakis in the Jean-Talon ward. He ran a second time in 1986 and defeated Civic Party incumbent Marc Beaudoin in the Gabriel-Sagard ward. The MCM won a landslide victory in this election under mayoral candidate Jean Doré, and Capparelli served as a backbench supporter of Doré's administration for the next four years. He was re-elected in the 1990 election in the redistributed ward of François-Perrault over fellow incumbent Frank Venneri, a former MCM member who had joined the opposition Municipal Party.

Capparelli became increasingly critical of Doré's administration in the early 1990s. In November 1991, he was the only MCM councillor to support an opposition initiative that would have diverted money from paving de la Commune Street in Old Montreal to improving the state of the city's playgrounds. He also voiced objections about the MCM's 1991 budget, and he openly criticized his party in the media several times in early 1992. Other MCM councillors were also critical of the party's direction in the same period.

Capparelli re-confirmed his support for the MCM in September 1992 after Doré promised to address the concerns of party dissidents. The internal divisions continued, however, and in 1993 Capparelli voted against an MCM initiative for Montreal to lease space in the World Trade Center, charging that the decision was made in an undemocratic fashion. He ultimately resigned from the MCM on December 20, 1993, describing the Doré administration as "incompetent" and dominated by an "omnipresent" executive committee. He also complained that party discipline rules prevented councillors from voting their conscience. 
Vision Montreal
Capparelli was briefly a member of Claude Beauchamp's Action Montreal party from March to April 1994. This party was not formally recognized, and Capparelli technically remained an independent councillor.

Beauchamp dissolved Action Montreal in April 1994 to support the Vision Montreal group that was then coalescing under Pierre Bourque's leadership. Capparelli joined Vision Montreal in September 1994 and was re-elected under its banner in the 1994 municipal election. Bourque defeated Doré in this election to become Montreal's mayor, and Vision Montreal won a significant majority on council; in November 1994, Bourque appointed Capparelli to the executive committee with responsibility for income security and social issues.

Capparelli indicated his opposition to affirmative action programs in a media interview in February 1995. He clarified that he was not speaking on behalf of Bourque's administration.

Bourque removed Capparelli from the executive committee on October 4, 1996, and reassigned him as assistant to committee chair Noushig Eloyan. Capparelli sought a court injunction to reverse his demotion, arguing that the mayor did not have the legal right to remove him from the executive. Nothing appears to have come from this. Capparelli ultimately broke with Bourque in January 1997, saying, "I no longer have confidence in the mayor. The problem is that Mr. Bourque wants to concentrate all the power at city hall in his own hand."

Capparelli was expelled from the Vision Montreal caucus on February 11, 1997, and served for a time as an independent councillor. In early 1998, he joined an informal group of opposition councillors led by Sammy Forcillo. He later rejoined the Montreal Citizens' Movement and ran for the party in the 1998 election; he lost to Frank Venneri, who by this time had joined Vision Montreal.

Subsequent elections
Capparelli later rejoined Vision Montreal and ran for city council under its banner in the 2005 municipal election. He again lost to Venneri, who by this time had joined Gérald Tremblay's Montreal Island Citizens Union.

Capparelli ran for borough mayor of Saint-Leonard in 2009 and finished a distant second against Union Montreal incumbent Michel Bissonnet.

Electoral record

References

Living people
Canadian politicians of Italian descent
Montreal city councillors
Year of birth missing (living people)